Addison Brian Dale (born 10 November 1942) is a Zimbabwean former weightlifter. He competed in the men's heavyweight I event at the 1980 Summer Olympics.

References

External links
 

1942 births
Living people
Zimbabwean male weightlifters
Olympic weightlifters of Zimbabwe
Weightlifters at the 1980 Summer Olympics
Place of birth missing (living people)
20th-century Zimbabwean people
21st-century Zimbabwean people